Tito Yupanqui Municipality is the third municipal section of the Manco Kapac Province in the  La Paz Department, Bolivia. Its seat is Tito Yupanqui.

References 

  Instituto Nacional de Estadistica de Bolivia  (INE)

Municipalities of La Paz Department (Bolivia)